is a Japanese manga series written and illustrated by Cha Kurii. It has been serialized in Square Enix's seinen manga magazine Young Gangan since September 2012, with its chapters collected in nineteen tankōbon volumes as of December 2021. A twelve-episode original net animation (ONA) animated by TYO Animations was released from May 2011 to July 2012; the first five episodes were released online while the other seven were released on home video.

Plot
+Tic Elder Sister narrative is centered around three students: Iroe Genma, Makina Sakamaki, and Hazuki Okamoto. They are in a plastic-model building club and interact with each other and fellow students.

Characters

Iroe is the head of the Model Club, nicknamed . Despite her short stature, her underclassmen (and some adults) call her by this nickname. In contrast, her classmates call her . She is generally vulgar, outrageous and is a big troublemaker. She likes being the center of attention and making fun of her fellow club members. A model of a castle stands on her head before she loses interest in models.

An underclassman of Nee-san, Hazuki is one of the members of the Model Club, nicknamed . She is a classmate of Makimaki and sits next to her in class. She is generally levelheaded and calm but is prone to getting violent and monstrous when it comes to Nee-san's antics. She is shown to have a gentle and caring side, later attributed to sporadic "Okappa Days". She is weak against insects, especially large cockroaches. She has a model of a train on her head before she loses interest in models.

An underclassman of Nee-san, Makina is one of the members of the Model Club, nicknamed . She is a classmate of Okappa and sits next to her in class. She is the most rational member of the Model Club and plays the role of the straight man to Nee-san and Okappa. She was overweight throughout elementary school before rapidly losing weight in middle school. A model of a tank sits on her head before she loses interest in models.

A high school senior, Kuniki is the muscular captain of the baseball team. He wears women's underwear and often exposes himself in public. Because of this, he is well-known even in other schools.

A 33-year-old teacher, Mizuno teaches Health education. Despite her age and status, she still calls Iroe "Nee-san." She is also the best friend of fellow teacher Masuda whom she affectionately refers to as "Masuda-chan." She has bitter memories of her ex-boyfriend breaking up with her because of a hairy back.

A high school freshman, Azuma is often seen with his partner, Student Council Member A. The pair were once cornered by a pair of delinquents but were "saved" by Kuniki. Because of that encounter, they are now scared of him. It is also revealed he lives alone and subsists largely on junk foods such as sweet buns.

A high school senior, Sanada is a classmate of Nee-san. He calls Nee-san "Chibiko". He is a member of the basketball team.

A high school senior, Saotomi is a chubby, mysterious schoolgirl with self-proclaimed "beauty." She believes that hair and skin care is important and usually gives the Model Club her unneeded advice.

She is the twin sister of Sano. Nee-san usually hangs out with them if she's not with the Model Club. Like Nee-san, she has a short stature and a flat chest.

She is the twin sister of Uno. Nee-san usually hangs out with them if she's not with the Model Club. Like Nee-san, she has a short stature and a flat chest.

A high school freshman, Tada is a member of the baseball team. He likes over-the-knee socks, especially Makimaki's.

A gigantic high schooler, she is shown tormenting the twins Uno and Sano and forces them to make mochi for her.

A high school senior, Himekawa is a classmate of Nee-san. Like Sanada, she calls Nee-san "Chibiko". She is a staff member of the basketball team. She is tall, beautiful and has large breasts, and because of this, the boys in her class sent her résumé to an entertainment office. Her birthday is on August 23.

Media

Manga
Square Enix has collected its chapters into individual tankōbon volumes. The first volume was released on May 25, 2011. As of December 25, 2021, nineteen volumes have been released.

A spin-off manga, titled , has been published in two volumes released on November 25, 2016, and August 25, 2020. A second spin-off, titled , was released on May 25, 2016.

Volume list

Original net animation
An original net animation (ONA) consisting of twelve-episode of two minute each animated by TYO Animations began streaming on May 16, 2011, The fifth episode was launched on February 23, 2012, and the other seven episodes were released on a limited-edition Blu-ray Disc and DVD release on July 31 of the same year, with the regular edition released on August 22.

References

External links
 Official site
 

2009 manga
2011 anime ONAs
Comedy anime and manga
Gangan Comics manga
Seinen manga
Square Enix franchises
Yumeta Company